35 Cygni is a spectroscopic binary star in the constellation Cygnus. Its apparent magnitude is 5.18. Located around  distant, its primary is a yellow supergiant of spectral type F6Ib, a massive star that has used up its core hydrogen and is now fusing heavier elements.

Yellow supergiants are usually variable, often Classical Cepheid variables, but 35 Cyg is notable for having an especially constant brightness.

35 Cyg is a single-lined spectroscopic binary with a period of 2,440 days (over 6 years).  The secondary cannot be seen directly, nor can its spectral lines be identified but the overall spectrum can be match by a combination of an F4 supergiant and a less luminous B6.5 star.

References

Cygnus (constellation)
Cygni, 35
F-type supergiants
Spectroscopic binaries
B-type main-sequence stars
7770
193370
BD+34 3967
100122